The China Shop is a short animated Disney cartoon, released in 1934 in the Silly Symphonies series. The cartoon was released on January 13, 1934. The short was directed by Wilfred Jackson and is said to be a step ahead in the character staging for the age, because of the thoughtful opening scene in which the shopkeeper closes the store, contrasting with the broad kind of movements made by the time.

Plot
It's closing time at "Ye Olde China Shop". The china pieces come to life to dance. A china demon kidnaps a female figurine, the male figurine tries to rescue her and a fight that involves the china demon throwing dishes at the male figurine (which also damages both an ostrich figurine which sticks its head into the base that it's standing on and one of the monkey figurines) ensues. The demon is defeated as he is broken into pieces. The next morning when the owner arrives and sees the damage he sells the china as antiques.

Home media
The short was released on December 19, 2006, on Walt Disney Treasures: More Silly Symphonies, Volume Two in the "From the Vault" section. Prior to that, the featurette also appeared on the Walt Disney Cartoon Classics Limited Gold Edition: Silly Symphonies VHS in the 1980s.

References

External links

Disney Shorts

1930s Disney animated short films
1934 films
1934 short films
Films based on works by Hans Christian Andersen
Films directed by Wilfred Jackson
Films produced by Walt Disney
Silly Symphonies
1934 animated films
Demons in film
Films scored by Leigh Harline
Animated films without speech
Films based on fairy tales
1930s English-language films
1930s American films